Freeport is a town in the Republic of Trinidad and Tobago.  It is located in west-central Trinidad, and is administered by the Couva–Tabaquite–Talparo Regional Corporation. It has a population of 11,850.

The estimated terrain elevation above sea level is 27 metres.

Populated coastal places in Trinidad and Tobago